American entertainer Whitney Houston, nicknamed “The Voice”, accolades include 2 Emmy Awards, 6 Grammy Awards (including Record and Album of the year wins), 14 World Music Awards, 16 Billboard Music Awards, 22 American Music Awards and collected a total 28 entries in within the Guinness World Records. Her inductions include the Grammy Hall of Fame (twice), the Rhythm and Blues Music Hall of Fame, the Rock and Roll Hall of Fame, and the New Jersey Hall of Fame. Whitney Houston is considered one of the greatest vocalists in popular music and one of the most influential performers of all time.

Houston held the record for the most American Music Awards received in a single year by a woman with eight wins in 1994 (overall tied with Michael Jackson). Houston won a record 11 Billboard Music Awards at its fourth ceremony in 1993. She also had the record for the most WMAs won in a single year, winning five awards at the 6th World Music Awards in 1994.

1985 

Note:
A^ The Billboard Music Awards, based on Billboard magazine's year-end charts, was not held before 1990; prior to that date they were presented as "Billboard Number One Awards"

1986

1987

1988 

Note:
B^ Houston earned the award for charitable acts including a public service announcement urging minority youth to study science and math, and participation on an Arista Records charity album whose proceeds went to the United Negro College Fund.
C^ She received the honorary doctorate degree for her contribution to the arts through music.

1989

1990 

Note:
D^ Houston was honored for her long-standing dedication to Black higher education.

1991 

Note:
E^ Houston was presented this award for her achievements as an award-winning recording, performing and video artist, for her successful I'm Your Baby Tonight World Tour, for her best-selling video and single of "The Star-Spangled Banner" performed at Super Bowl XXV and for her multi platinum album, I'm Your Baby Tonight.

1992

1993 

Note:
F^  Awards marked with ★ were presented during the show. The remaining awards are additional #1-ranked-categories from Billboard magazine's Year-End Charts of 1993.

1994
 At the 21st American Music Awards, Houston set a record becoming the first female artist with the most wins in one night, with a total of 7 awards. This ties her with Michael Jackson as they both won 7 awards and one special merit award (in the same night). At the 6th annual World Music Awards, Houston won 5 awards during the ceremony.

Note:
K^ Houston received the award "in recognition of her outstanding contributions to the musical entertainment of the American public."
L^ Special Award - this award is presented by the Recording Industry Association of Japan (RIAJ) to the product which released before that year, sales over one million units or higher than a product get the award on the same category in that year.

1995 

Note:
M^ Houston earned the award for her charitable works with the Whitney Houston Foundation for Children, Inc.

1996 

Note:
N^ The award was created to "recognize the significant contribution of African-Americans in the entertainment industry."

1997

1998 

Note:
O^ Trumpet Awards — the awards are intended to honor blacks who, through consistency and longevity, have inspired others and have achieved success in their chosen professions or careers.

1999 

Note:
P^ Houston was honored for the support of the Whitney Houston Foundation for Children, which contributed a $40,000 grant for the construction of a medical examination room in the center.
Q^ Whitney Houston received the award for her 20-year career as a musical artist.

2000

2001

2003–2009 

Note:
S^ The New Jersey Walk of Fame honored the lives and achievements of extraordinary performing artists who are associated with the Garden State and/or its institutions.

2010

2012

2013

2014 - 2022

See also 
 List of accolades received by The Bodyguard (soundtrack)

References

Awards
Houston, Whitney